Drummond may refer to:

Places

Antarctica 
 Drummond Peak, King Edward VII Land
 Drummond Glacier, Graham Land

Canada 
 Drummond (electoral district), a Quebec federal riding
 Drummond (provincial electoral district), Quebec
 Drummond Regional County Municipality, Quebec
 Drummondville, Quebec
 Drummond Parish, New Brunswick
 Drummond, New Brunswick, a village therein
 Drummond/North Elmsley, Ontario, formed from the merger of Drummond Township and North Elmsley Township
 Drummond, a community in the township of Otonabee–South Monaghan, Ontario

Northern Ireland 
 Drummond Cricket Club Ground
 Drummond railway station

United States 
 Drummond, Idaho, a city
 Drummond, Maryland, a village and special taxing district
 Drummond, Michigan
 Drummond Township, Michigan
 Drummond, Montana, a town
 Drummond, Oklahoma, a town
 Drummond, Wisconsin, a town
 Drummond (CDP), Wisconsin, an unincorporated census-designated place within the town
 Drummond Town, Virginia, the former name for Accomac, Virginia
 Lake Drummond, Virginia
 Drummond Island, Michigan

Other 
 Drummond, Victoria, a locality in Australia
 Drummond Nature Reserve, west of Bolgart, Western Australia
 Drummond, New Zealand, a town
 Drummond, KwaZulu-Natal, South Africa, a town
 4693 Drummond, an asteroid (see List of minor planets: 4001–5000)
 Drummond Street (disambiguation)

Buildings 
 Drummond Castle, Perthshire, Scotland
 Drummond Methodist Church, Ottawa, Canada
 Drummond Business Block, Eau Claire, Wisconsin, on the National Register of Historic Places

People 
 Clan Drummond
 Drummond (given name)
 Drummond (surname)

Military and coast guard 
 , a class of three corvettes of the Argentine Navy built in France
 , two ships of the Argentine Navy named Drummond
 USCGC Drummond (WPB-1323), a former United States Coast Guard patrol boat
 Fort Drummond (Queenston Heights), Queenston Heights, Ontario, Canada, a fort of the War of 1812
 Fort Drummond (Drummond Island, Michigan), a fort on Drummond Island, Michigan of the War of 1812
 Drummond Battery, protecting Port Kembla, New South Wales, Australia during World War II

Other uses 
 Drummond, an Australia studio-only soft rock group, which became Mississippi in 1972.
 Drummond Company, a coal mining company with operations in Alabama and Colombia
 Drummond Tobacco Company, tobacco company in St. Louis, Missouri from 1873 to 1898.
 Lord Drummond (disambiguation), various titles of Scotland and Great Britain, and a fictional character
 Drummond baronets, two extinct titles in the Baronetage of the United Kingdom
 a 6-row malting barley variety

See also 
 Drummonds (disambiguation)
 McKean Island, Phoenix Islands, Republic of Kiribati, first called Drummond's Island 
 Tabiteuea, an atoll in the Gilbert Islands, Kiribati, formerly known as Drummond's Island